Konstantinos Papathanassiou from the German Aerospace Center (DLR) in Wessling, Germany was named Fellow of the Institute of Electrical and Electronics Engineers (IEEE) in 2014 for contributions to polarimetric interferometry for synthetic aperture radar.

References 

Fellow Members of the IEEE
Living people
Year of birth missing (living people)
Place of birth missing (living people)